Ali Salim Obaid Bait Al-Nahar (born 21 August 1992), commonly known as Ali Salim Al-Nahar, is an Omani footballer who plays for Dhofar S.C.S.C. in Oman Professional League.

Club career
He began his professional playing career with Omani giants Dhofar S.C.S.C. in 2010. At the end of the 2011-12 season, he scored his first goal for the club in a 2-1 win over rivals Al-Ittihad Club in the final of 2011 Sultan Qaboos Cup hence helping his club to clinch their 8th Sultan Qaboos Cup title.

Club career statistics

International career
Ali is part of the first team squad of the Oman national football team. He was selected for the national team for the first time in 2012. He made his first appearance for Oman on 11 December 2012 against Kuwait in the 2012 WAFF Championship. He has made appearances in the 2012 WAFF Championship, the 2014 FIFA World Cup qualification, the 2014 WAFF Championship and the 2015 AFC Asian Cup qualification and has represented the national team in the 2013 Gulf Cup of Nations.

Honours

Club
With Dhofar
Omani League (0): Runner-up 2009-10
Sultan Qaboos Cup (1): 2011
Oman Professional League Cup (1): 2012-13; Runner-up 2014–15
Oman Super Cup (0): Runner-up 2012
Baniyas SC International Tournament (1): Winner 2014

References

External links
 
 
 Ali Salim Al-Nahar at Goal.com
 
 
 Ali Salim Al Nahar - ASIAN CUP Australia 2015

1992 births
Living people
People from Salalah
Omani footballers
Oman international footballers
Association football defenders
2015 AFC Asian Cup players
Dhofar Club players
Oman Professional League players